Edwin Eziyodawe (born 9 May 1988 in Benin City), is a Nigerian football midfielder.

Career
Eziyodawe began his career with Bendel Insurance F.C. and was promoted to the senior squad in 2006. He earned his first caps in the Nigerian FA Cup, and scored his first professional goal on 20 October 2006, in the final against Dolphins F.C. After two years with Bendel Insurance F.C. he signed for league rival Sharks F.C. in February 2008. On 22 January 2009 was signed by Lillestrøm SK in Norway.

Career statistics 

2011-2012 Sharks Fc

References

External links
Club bio

1988 births
Living people
Nigerian footballers
Nigerian expatriate footballers
Eliteserien players
Lillestrøm SK players
Expatriate footballers in Norway
Sharks F.C. players
Sportspeople from Benin City
Bendel Insurance F.C. players
Association football forwards